Minimata Agam Dass Guru (15 March 191631 May 1973) was an Indian politician from the Indian National Congress Party, and a member of parliament in the First, Second, Third, Fourth, and Fifth Lok Sabha (lower house of the Parliament of India).

Early life 
Minimata was born in Nawagaon district in Assam in 1916. She was educated at Girls School, Nawagon and Raipur.

Political career 
Minimata was elected to the first Lok Sabha in a bye-election in 1955 after the death of the sitting MP, her husband, Guru Agamdas. She contested the same constituency on a Congress party nomination and won. In 1962, she contested for the Indian National Congress party in Madhya Pradesh state, in Baloda Bazar, a Scheduled Caste reserved constituency. She won with more than 52% of the vote, defeating the Prajya Socialist Party candidate. In 1967, she contested for the Indian National Congress Party in the Schedule Caste reserved constituency of Janjgir, then in Madhya Pradesh state, winning with more than 62% of the vote. Minimata contested the same constituency of Janjgir in 1971, again for the Indian National Congress Party, and again winning the election. She died in 1973 before the end of her parliamentary term, prompting a by-election.

Besides her parliamentary work, she served as General Secretary, State Congress Committee; President of Guru Ghasidas Seva Sangh; President of Harijan Education Society; Vice-President, State Depressed Classes League; Secretary, Mahila Mandal, Raipur. She was also a member of the Social Welfare Board, Raipur and a member of District Congress Committee, Raipur.

Minimata was associated with Satnami politics, a form of Ambedkarite Dalit self-assertion. After the death of her husband, she took on the leadership of the community. She stood against casteism and untouchability, as well as child marriage and dowry.

Personal life 
She married Shri Agam Dass Guru on 2 July 1930. Her parliamentary profile listed her hobbies as reading, knitting, embroidery, cooking and gardening, and debating and discussion on social and political affairs.

Minimata died in an airplane crash on a flight from Raipur to Delhi; the plane crashed as it tried to land at Palam airport.

References 

Indian National Congress politicians
Women members of the Lok Sabha
1916 births
1973 deaths
Lok Sabha members from Madhya Pradesh
India MPs 1952–1957
India MPs 1957–1962
India MPs 1962–1967
India MPs 1967–1970
India MPs 1971–1977
People from Nagaon district
People from Raipur district
People from Janjgir-Champa district